Lloyd Goffe (born 30 January 1913 in Reading - died 1984) was a British motorcycle speedway rider.

Goffe began his racing career in 1934 at the sand track in the resort of California near Wokingham, riding for prize money. He then concentrated on grasstrack racing, winning the South of England Grass Track Championship at Basingstoke in 1936. He bought a 500cc Rudge bike from "Froggy" French in 1936, which he used in his early speedway rides, impressing sufficiently to receive offers from both Hackney Wick Wolves and the Johnny Hoskins-managed West Ham Hammers, signing for the latter in 1937. He had a brief spell with the Leicester Hounds team, riding in three matches in 1937 before the club withdrew from the Provincial League.

His performances progressed after transferring to the Harringay Tigers later that season, staying with the team until the outbreak of World War II. During the war, he served as a fitter in the Royal Air Force.

After the end of the war, Goffe joined the Wimbledon Dons in 1946. His riding style led to him being nicknamed "Cowboy". In 1948 Goffe rejoined Harringay (now the 'Racers') for a 1,350 transfer fee, where he won the Anniversary Cup in 1949 and by 1950 his career completed a full circle when he rejoined West Ham.

In 1951 he rode for Bradford, and started the 1952 season there before he joined the St Austell Gulls.

World Final Appearances
 1949 -  London, Wembley Stadium - 14th - 2pts

References 

1913 births
1984 deaths
Military personnel from Reading, Berkshire
British speedway riders
English motorcycle racers
West Ham Hammers riders
Harringay Racers riders
Wimbledon Dons riders
St Austell Gulls riders
Sportspeople from Reading, Berkshire
Royal Air Force airmen
Royal Air Force personnel of World War II